"(Something Inside) So Strong" is a song written and recorded by British singer-songwriter Labi Siffre. Released as a single in 1987, it was one of the biggest successes of his career, peaking at number four on the UK Singles Chart.

The song was written in 1984, inspired by a television documentary on apartheid in South Africa seen by Siffre in which white soldiers were filmed shooting at black civilians in the street. He told the BBC's Soul Music programme in 2014 that the song was also influenced by his experience as a homosexual child, adolescent, and adult. Siffre originally intended to give the song to another artist to sing, but could find no one suitable and was persuaded to release it himself.

The song has remained enduringly popular and is an example of the political and sociological thread running through much of Siffre's lyrics and poetry. It won the Ivor Novello Award for Best Song Musically and Lyrically, and has been used in Amnesty International campaigns.

Charts

The Rosa Parks Tribute Singers version
In 1995, Verity Records released Verity Records Presents: A Tribute to Mrs. Rosa Parks. A cover version performed by a chorus of gospel singers, including Fred Hammond (who produced the track), Yolanda Adams, Shirley Caesar, Daryl Coley and Vanessa Bell Armstrong, was the first track.

Rik Waller version
Pop Idol contestant Rik Waller reached number 25 on the UK Singles Chart with his cover version in July 2002.

Barry from EastEnders version
A 2014 rendition of "(Something Inside) So Strong" by the British actor Shaun Williamson (a.k.a. Barry from EastEnders) was performed live at the 2014 World Indoor Bowls Championship,

After being televised live nationally, it became a popular meme and was notably mashed up in video form with two successive U.S. presidential inauguration ceremonies.

References

1984 songs
1987 singles
2002 singles
Labi Siffre songs
Rik Waller songs
Songs written by Labi Siffre
Opposition to apartheid in South Africa
Anti-apartheid songs
Michael Ball songs
LGBT-related songs
China Records singles